The Treaty of Andernach ended a long war between Baldwin V, count of Flanders and Godfrey III, Duke of Upper and Lower Lorraine, on one side, and Henry III, Holy Roman Emperor, on the other.

Under the terms of the treaty, Baldwin V was forced to cede a march at Valenciennes to Herman, count of Mons and Hainaut.  In exchange, he was granted a march at Ename.

11th-century treaties